The Chris Candido Memorial Tag Team Tournament was a professional wrestling tag team single-elimination tournament held by the Total Nonstop Action Wrestling (TNA) promotion in 2005. It was held to honor the TNA wrestler Chris Candido, who died in April 2005 as a result of acute pneumonia. It is the only edition held as of  despite it being announced as an annual event. The competition began on August 16, 2005 and concluded on August 16, 2005 at the tapings of TNA's television program TNA Impact!. It was broadcast from the August 19 to September 9 episodes of Impact!. It was known by various names: 2005 Chris Candido Memorial Tag Team Tournament, The Chris Candido Memorial Tag Team Tournament, and The Chris Candido Cup Tournament.

The concept of the tournament was to have eight teams consisting of one veteran wrestler and one rookie wrestler competing against each other to gain entry into a Four Way Elimination Tag Team match for the NWA World Tag Team Championship at TNA's Unbreakable PPV event on September 11. The tournament featured sixteen TNA wrestlers: Abyss, Shark Boy, Alex Shelley, Sean Waltman, B.G. James, Cassidy Reilly, Chris Sabin, Shocker, Kip James, Petey Williams, Konnan, Lance Hoyt, Mikey Batts, Simon Diamond, Ron Killings, and Sonjay Dutt.

The tournament was well-received overall. James Caldwell of the Pro Wrestling Torch wrote in his review of the matches that they were "solid" and "effective in telling the story." Caldwell approved of the teaming of Shelley and Waltman, feeling that they were a "natural fit."

Background
Chris Candido was an American professional wrestler who wrestled for TNA starting in 2005. At TNA's Lockdown PPV event on April 24, 2005, Candido teamed with Lance Hoyt to face Apolo and Sonny Siaki in a Six Sides of Steel Cage match. During the encounter, Candido suffered an injury which was later diagnosed as a dislocated ankle, broken tibia, and a broken fibula which required surgery. Candido had an operation on April 25 to have a plate, screws, and pins placed in his ankle to fix the problem with him being sidelined from competing for two to three months in order to heal. However, Candido hoped to be fully recovered in six to eight weeks. On April 28, Candido was rushed to the hospital after he collapsed, where he died a short time later. The cause of death was released by Candido's brother Johnny Candido as a blood clot due to the surgery a few days prior.

TNA released a public statement on April 29, regarding the subject. TNA paid tribute to Candido on the April 29 episode of TNA's television program TNA Impact! as well as at TNA's Hard Justice PPV event on May 15. The April 29 episode of Impact! opened and ended with a memorial to Candido. At Hard Justice, a ten-bell salute was held while a photo of Candido, a pair of boots, and one-half of the NWA World Tag Team Championship positioned on a steel chair sat in the center of the ring. A portion of the Lockdown DVD sale profits were donated by TNA to the Chris Candido Memorial Fund. TNA originally planned to remove Candido's match from the DVD, but were given the blessing of his family to include it on the publication. A tribute to Candido was included on the DVD by TNA.

The tournament was announced in August 2005 by TNA editor Bill Banks. He revealed the official name for the competition, the "2005 Chris Candido Memorial Tag Team Tournament", and that TNA were planning on it being an annual contest. Banks also announced the format of the tournament involved veteran wrestlers teaming with young wrestlers in order to compete. The idea behind the contest was explained on the August 19 episode of Impact! prior to the opening bout of the tournament. The tournament was set up in a way to mimic Candido's role at the time of his death. Prior to his death, the veteran Candido was managing the young tag team of The Naturals (Andy Douglas and Chase Stevens). Candido managed the team to winning the NWA World Tag Team Championship from America's Most Wanted (Chris Harris and James Storm; AMW) on the April 29 episode of Impact!, which had been taped on April 25 prior to his death.

In the tournament, eight tag teams were determined at random, with one veteran wrestler being placed with a younger wrestler from the company. The competition was also referred to as the "Chris Candido Memorial Cup Tournament". The teams chosen at random were Abyss (veteran) and Shark Boy (young), Alex Shelley (young) and Sean Waltman (veteran), B.G. James (veteran) and Cassidy Reilly (young), Chris Sabin (young) and Shocker (veteran), Kip James (veteran) and Petey Williams (young), Konnan (veteran) and Lance Hoyt (young), Mikey Batts (young) and Simon Diamond (veteran), and last of all Ron Killings (veteran) and Sonjay Dutt (young). On the August 26 episode of Impact!, NWA Championship Committee member Larry Zbyszko announced that a Four Way Elimination Tag Team match for the NWA World Tag Team Championship was planned for TNA's Unbreakable PPV event on September 11, in which The Naturals would defend against AMW, Team Canada (A-1 and Eric Young), and the winners of the Chris Candido Memorial Tag Team Tournament.

Tournament
The Chris Candido Memorial Tag Team Tournament featured seven matches involving different wrestlers from pre-existing scripted feuds and storylines. Wrestlers portrayed villains, heroes, or less distinguishable characters in the scripted events that built tension and culminated in a wrestling match.

The tournament consisted of three rounds: the quarterfinals, semifinals, and finals. All three rounds were broadcast on Impact!. All three rounds were taped on August 16 and aired on the August 19, August 26, September 2, and September 9 episodes of Impact!.

Quarterfinals
The first two matches of the quarterfinals took place on the August 19 episode of Impact!. The team of Chris Sabin and Shocker were pitted against the team of Mikey Batts and Simon Diamond in the first. Sabin and Shocker won the bout after Sabin slammed Batts back-first into the mat with his signature Cradle Shock maneuver and followed with the pin at 7 minutes and 1 second. In the second, the team of B.G. James and Cassidy Reilly fought the team of Ron Killings and Sonjay Dutt. Dutt won the match at 4 minutes and 14 seconds for his team after a 450° aerial splash onto Reilly and the pin.

The last two were held on the August 26 episode of Impact!. The team of Alex Shelley and Sean Waltman faced Abyss and Shark Boy in a bout lasting 4 minutes and 10 seconds. Shelley pinned Shark Boy after slamming him face-first into the mat with his signature Shellshock maneuver. The second encounter was between the team of Lance Hoyt and Konnan and the team of Kip James and Petey Williams. The team of Hoyt and Konnan won the bout after Hoyt pinned Kip following a boot to the face at 6 minutes and 49 seconds.

Semifinals
The semifinals were held on the September 2 episode of Impact!. Shelley and Waltman defeated the team of Hoyt and Konnan in the first semifinal match at 4 minutes and 22 seconds. During the match, Hoyt hit Waltman with a boot to the face and went for the pin, but the referee was distracted by Kip James who came down to ringside. Hoyt went to get the referee, giving Waltman the ability to hit him in the groin and follow-up by slamming him face-first into the mat with his signature X-Factor maneuver.

In the second semifinal match, Sabin and Shocker defeated Dutt and Killings at 7 minutes and 49 seconds. During the contest, Sabin accidentally hit his teammate Shocker in the face. This led to some confusion in the match, allowing Killings to get a near-fall on Sabin. This was later resolved, with Sabin getting the pin on Dutt via la magistral.

Finals
The final round occurred on the September 9 episode of Impact!, with Sabin and Shocker versus Shelley and Waltman. This contest lasted 7 minutes and 20 seconds. Sabin and Shelley started off the match, with Shelley dominating Sabin with mat submission holds. The wrestling left the ring as Waltman performed a somersault splash to the ringside area onto Shocker and Sabin. Later, Sabin ascended to the top-rope to perform a dropkick onto Shelley, to only have Shelley dodge out of the way, resulting in Sabin hitting his partner Shocker instead. After checking on Shocker, Sabin turned around and was met with a kick to the jaw from Shelley. Sabin left the ring after this due to a legitimate injury. With Shocker left and the referee attending to other matters, Waltman hit Shocker in the groin and followed by performing his X-Factor maneuver to gain the pinfall victory and to win the tournament.

With Shelley and Waltman's victory, they became the first winners of the expected annual tournament. They also gained entry into the Four Way Elimination Tag Team match for the NWA World Tag Team Championship scheduled for Unbreakable.

Tournament bracket

Reception
James Caldwell of the Pro Wrestling Torch felt that Chris Sabin and Shocker versus Simon Diamond and Mikey Batts was "solid wrestling" and a "nice opening match" for the tournament. When it came to the second match of the tournament,  B.G. James and Cassidy Reilly versus Ron Killings and Sonjay Dutt, Caldwell felt that James and Killings "undermined the spirit of the Candido tournament" by dancing mid-way through their encounter. Caldwell commented on the pairing of Alex Shelley and Sean Waltman for the tournament, saying they were a "natural fit working together" and expressing hope that they would be a permanent fixture after the tournament concluded. Regarding the semifinal matches, Caldwell thought Sabin and Shocker versus Dutt and Killings was a "solid match with a nice mini-storyline involving Sabin and Shocker having a miscommunication before settling their differences to win the match." As for the finals, Caldwell stated that Shelley and Waltman versus Sabin and Shocker was a "standard tag match" but it was "effective in telling the story of Waltman and Shelley doing whatever it takes to win while Shocker and Sabin continued to have differences that finally caused Shocker to go off." Caldwell concluded by saying that "Waltman and Shelley have impressed as a legit tag team since their first round match in the tournament," going on to say that he hoped for a Waltman and Shelley victory at Unbreakable to "give the tag division a fresh team to build around."

Aftermath

Chris Sabin's jaw was broken in the final round match. Sabin needed serious medical assistance afterwards backstage due to excessive bleeding from the mouth. Sabin had to cancel an August 19 Pro Wrestling Guerrilla (PWG) appearance as a result. Shelley was also injured while taking part in the tournament. He suffered a legitimate back injury, but ended up appearing at the PWG show that Sabin was forced to miss. There, he aggravated the injury further, forcing him to miss two Ring of Honor shows for which he was scheduled.

At Unbreakable, The Naturals (Andy Douglas and Chase Stevens) defeated the teams of Alex Shelley and Johnny Candido, America's Most Wanted (Chris Harris and James Storm), and Team Canada (A-1 and Eric Young) to remain champions in a Four Way Elimination Tag Team match. Johnny was a replacement for Waltman who missed the event due to undisclosed reasons. Shelley began the bout alone, until Johnny, who was in attendance along with several of Candido's family members, jumped the railing to join Shelley as his tag team partner by taking a tag from Shelley. A bit later, Douglas kicked Candido in the crotch and pinned him with a roll-up pin, thus eliminating Shelley and Candido from the contest.

Waltman was not used again by TNA until their Final Resolution PPV event on January 15, 2006. There, Waltman defeated Raven in a Raven's Rules match, forcing Raven to leave TNA in the storyline. Waltman was not used by the company due to management being angered by his failure to participate at Unbreakable. Despite him not showing up to the event, Waltman was in Orlando and dressed to compete, but did not arrive at the arena in time.

References

External links
Impact Wrestling.com

Impact Wrestling tournaments
2005 in professional wrestling
2005 in sports in Florida
Professional wrestling memorial shows
Professional wrestling in Florida
Tag team tournaments